Ansgar Elde (27 November 1933 – 4 December 2000) was a Swedish artist famous for his work in ceramics.

Elde was a member of the Situationist International (SI). On March 15, 1962, Elde was excluded from the SI along with Jørgen Nash. Both had been on the central committee and were accused of conspiring with certain art collectors. In fact, they had defended Ervin Eisch, Lothar Fischer, Dieter Kunzelmann, Renee Nele, Heimrad Prem, Gretel Stadler, Helmut Sturm and Hand-Peter Zimmer who had been excluded on February 10, 1962. He went on, with Jørgen Nash and others, to work on the Second Situationist International.

Elde collaborated with Asger Jorn on the large ceramic work made in Albisola, Italy, transported to Aarhus, Denmark by train.

In the early nineties Heike Arndt met Ansgar and accepted his invitation to Savona, Italy, where she developed her work.

1933 births
2000 deaths
Swedish artists